Asthenotricha proschora is a moth in the family Geometridae. It was described by David Stephen Fletcher in 1958. It is found in the Democratic Republic of the Congo and Uganda.

References

Moths described in 1958
Asthenotricha
Insects of Uganda
Moths of Africa